Second East–West Highway, also known as Simpang Pulai–Kuala Berang Highway, Federal Route 185 and Federal Route 36, is a highway in Peninsular Malaysia which connects Simpang Pulai in Perak to Kuala Jeneris in Terengganu. It overlaps with Federal Route 8 Federal Route 8 between Gua Musang and Sungai Relau. It is notorious for its many sharp corners which increase the risk of road accidents.

Route background
The Kilometre Zero of the Federal Route 185 is located at Simpang Pulai, Perak, at its junctions with the Federal Route 1, the main trunk road of the central of Peninsular Malaysia and end at Gua Musang town. Meanwhile, section from Chiku to Kuala Telemung regazetted as Federal Route 36 in February 2017.

History 
The highway used to be known as Perak State Route 181 from Simpang Pulai to Pos Slim before being extended eastwards and recommissioned as a federal highway. The construction of the highway began in 2001 and was completed in 2004. Phase 2 was completed at the end of 2010.

Location of the project
The route runs through the states of Perak, Pahang, Kelantan and Terengganu, starting at Simpang Pulai and traversing through the main range at Lojing, then Chiku, before entering Jalan Felda Aring and ending at Kuala Jeneris.

Project scope of work

Gua Musang to Chiku, Kelantan. The road is designed to Malaysian Public Works Department (JKR) geometric standard of R3 
with a design speed of 50 km/h.

In terms of riding comfort, this R3 standard falls in between the R5 or R6 standard for expressway (typically with a design speed of 80–110 km/h) and R1 or R2 standard such as the winding hilly road (typically with a design speed of 20–30 km/h).

Typically, the road is a two-lane single carriageway with a lane width of 3.5m and shoulder width of 2.5m. Climbing lanes are also provided at certain sections with steep gradient, to assist slow moving vehicles. The project also involves the construction of viaducts, bridges and culverts.

Those who want to go from Simpang Pulai to Kuala Berang/Kuala Berang to Simpang Pulai must go through part of federal route 8.

Estimated cost
The entire project is estimated to cost RM1.6 billion and divided into 10 packages for implementation.

Features

 Lojing Viaduct is the second highest bridge in Malaysia.

At most sections, the Federal Route 185 was built under the JKR R5 road standard, allowing maximum speed limit of up to 90 km/h.

The highway overlaps with T156 Jalan Pengkalan Utama from Kenyir Lake to Kuala Jeneris.

Notable events
20 December 2010 – Twenty-seven people, mostly Thai tourist were killed when the double-decked coach bus they were travelling in crashed at the Second East–West Highway of the Perak–Pahang border near Cameron Highlands, Pahang.

List of junctions and towns

This is a list of junctions and towns along the highway.

See also
 East–West Highway

References

Highways in Malaysia
145